James Bodell ( – 23 September 1892) was a New Zealand soldier, businessman, local politician and writer. He was born in Arnold, Nottinghamshire, England and was Mayor of Tauranga between 1888 and 1889.

Early life
The son of framework knitter William Bodell and his wife, Maria Margrom, James Bodell was baptized in Arnold – a town in the English ceremonial county of Nottinghamshire – on 3 July 1831.

Enlistment
Bodell enlisted in the 59th (2nd Nottinghamshire) Regiment of Foot in 1848, the year of a series of revolutions in Western and Central Europe.

Later life
Bodell served in the militia in Waikato from 1863 to 1866. He was briefly a photographer, in the 1870s.

His memoirs, edited by Sir Keith Sinclair, were published in 1982 as A Soldier’s View of Empire.

References

External links

1831 births
1892 deaths
Mayors of Tauranga
New Zealand businesspeople
English emigrants to New Zealand
New Zealand writers
New Zealand military personnel
People from Arnold, Nottinghamshire
19th-century New Zealand politicians